AI is artificial intelligence, intellectual ability in machines and robots.

Ai, AI or A.I. may also refer to:

Animals
 Ai (chimpanzee), an individual experimental subject in Japan
 Ai (sloth) or the pale-throated sloth, northern Amazonian mammal species

Arts, entertainment and media

Works
 Ai (album), a 2004 release by Seraphim
 A.I. Artificial Intelligence, a 2001 American film
 A.I. Rising, a 2018 Serbian film
 AI: The Somnium Files, a 2019 video game
 American Idol, televised singing contest
 The American Interest, a bimonthly magazine (2005–2020)
 I (2015 film), an Indian Tamil film (initial title: Ai)

Other uses in arts and media

 A.i. (band), a Californian rock–electroclash group
 All in (poker), wagering one's entire stake
 Appreciation Index, a British measure of broadcast programme approval
 The Art Institutes, a chain of American art schools
 Non-player character, in gaming (colloquially, an AI)

Business

 , a phrase in job titles
 Appreciative inquiry, an organizational development method
 All-inclusive, a full service at a vacation resort including meals and drinks

Organizations and businesses
 Accuracy International, a firearms manufacturer
 Adventure International, a video game publisher
 Air India, an Indian airline based in Delhi
 Alitalia, the former flag carrier airline of Italy
 Astra International, an Indonesian automotive company
 Alexis I. duPont High School, Delaware, U.S.
 Amnesty International, a human rights organisation
 Appraisal Institute, an association of real estate appraisers
 The Art Institutes, a chain of art schools

People
 Ai (surname), a Chinese surname
 Ai (given name), a given name and list of people and characters with the name
 King Ai of Zhou (died 441 BC)
 Emperor Ai of Han (27-1 BC)
 Emperor Ai of Jin (341-365)
 Emperor Ai of Tang (892–908)
 Ai (poet) (1947–2010), American poet
 Ai (singer) (born 1981), Japanese-American singer and songwriter
 Allen Iverson (born 1975), American retired professional basketball player ("A.I.")
 Andre Iguodala (born 1984), American professional basketball player ("A.I. 2.0")

Places

Areas
 Anguilla, a Caribbean territory (by ISO 3166-1 code)
 Appenzell Innerrhoden, a Swiss canton

Cities
 Ai (Canaan), Biblical city

United States 
 Ai, Alabama
 Ai, Georgia
 Ai, North Carolina
 Ai, Ohio

Landforms

Religion, philosophy and mythology
 Ái, a Norse god
 Ai (Canaan), Biblical city
 Ai, Sinic concepts of love from Confucianism and Buddhism
 , colloquially , a Greek word for 'saint'
 Ai Toyon, the Yakut god of light

Science and technology

Agricultural science
 Active ingredient, part of a pesticide
 Artificial insemination of livestock and pets, in animal breeding

Air force and aviation
 Airborne Internet, a proposed air-to-air data network
 Airborne Interception radar, a Royal Air Force air-to-air system
 Air interdiction, an aerial military capability
 Attitude indicator, a flight instrument on aircraft

The Internet
 .ai, a top-level domain

Medical conditions
 Accommodative insufficiency of the eye
 Amelogenesis imperfecta of teeth
 Aortic insufficiency of the heart

Medicines and healthcare
 Active ingredient, part of a drug
 Adequate intake, a Dietary Reference Intake nutritional parameter
 Aromatase inhibitor, a class of breast-cancer drug
 Articulation Index, a method of measuring hearing loss
 Artificial insemination, a method of fertilisation

Visual arts technologies
 Adobe Illustrator, a vector graphics editor
 .ai, Adobe Illustrator Artwork filename extension
 Automatic Maximum-Aperture Indexing, aperture coupling on Nikon camera lenses

See also
 Artificial intelligence (disambiguation)
 Art Institute (disambiguation)
 All In (disambiguation)
 A1 (disambiguation)
 AL (disambiguation)
 AY (disambiguation)
 Aye (disambiguation)
 Eye (disambiguation)